Mexrenone (code names ZK-32055, SC-25152) is a steroidal antimineralocorticoid of the spirolactone group related to spironolactone that was never marketed. It is the lactonic form of mexrenoic acid (mexrenoate), and mexrenoate potassium (SC-26714), the potassium salt of mexrenoic acid, also exists. In addition to the mineralocorticoid receptor, mexrenone also binds to the glucocorticoid, androgen, and progesterone receptors. Relative to spironolactone, it has markedly reduced antiandrogen activity (approximately one-tenth of the antimineralocorticoid dosage equivalent antiandrogen activity of spironolactone). Eplerenone is the 9-11α-epoxy analogue of mexrenone.

See also
 Canrenone
 Mexrenoate potassium
 Mexrenoic acid
 Potassium canrenoate
 Prorenone

References

Abandoned drugs
Antimineralocorticoids
Pregnanes
Spiro compounds
Spirolactones
Steroidal antiandrogens